Alessandro Badiale (1626–1671) was an Italian painter and engraver of the Baroque period, active in Bologna. He was a pupil of Flaminio Torre. Among his etchings are prints of Virgin seated with the Infant Jesus, between St. Philip Neri and St. Anthony of Padua, a Deposition and a Holy Family after Flaminio Torre. He also made a Madonna with Child, who holds a cross and an apple after Cignani.

References

1626 births
1671 deaths
17th-century Italian painters
Italian male painters
Painters from Bologna
Italian Baroque painters